Anthony Duclair (born August 26, 1995) is a Canadian professional ice hockey forward currently playing for the Florida Panthers of the National Hockey League (NHL). Duclair was selected by the New York Rangers in the third round, 80th overall, of the 2013 NHL Entry Draft, the organization with which he began his NHL career. Duclair has also played in the NHL for the Arizona Coyotes, Chicago Blackhawks, Columbus Blue Jackets and Ottawa Senators.

Early years
Duclair was born on August 26, 1995, in Pointe-Claire, Quebec, and was raised in Laval by Haitian immigrants Wendell Duclair and Dominique Raphael. While both his father and uncle played Canadian football, with uncle Farell Duclair helping the Calgary Stampeders win the 86th Grey Cup in 1998, Anthony instead played ice hockey. A fan of the Montreal Canadiens of the National Hockey League (NHL), Duclair's favorite childhood hockey player was Saku Koivu.

Duclair began ice skating at the age of two and playing hockey two years later. As a child, Duclair attended schools where he would be finished with class early in the afternoon, allowing him to spend more time practicing hockey. In 2008, he and Frédérik Gauthier appeared in the Quebec International Pee-Wee Hockey Tournament with a minor ice hockey affiliate of the Canadiens. As an adolescent, he played with the Lac St. Louis Lions of the Quebec Midget AAA Hockey League. In 2011, the Lions won the Jimmy Ferrari Cup, and Duclair was awarded the Mario Lemieux Trophy for the top 15-year-old prospect in the league. The Lions then advanced to the Telus Cup, where Duclair scored two goals in their bronze medal match win over the Vancouver North West Giants.

Playing career

Junior
Duclair spent three seasons with the Quebec Remparts of the Quebec Major Junior Hockey League (QMJHL). He scored an impressive 50 goals in 59 games during the 2013–14 season. Duclair was rewarded for his outstanding play being named to the QMJHL First All-Star Team.

Professional

New York Rangers (2014–15) 
Duclair signed an entry-level contract with the Rangers on January 2, 2014. Because he waited until the beginning of 2014 to sign, under the NHL collective bargaining agreement, Duclair was exempt from a usual clause with rookie players in which they can be returned to their junior teams within the first 10 games of an NHL season without triggering the first year of their contract. He impressed head coach Alain Vigneault during the Rangers' 2014 training camp, but was not able to appear on their opening night roster until the team was under their 50-contract limit. General manager Glen Sather traded defenseman Steven Kampfer and forward Andrew Yogan to the Florida Panthers in exchange for Joey Crabb in order to accommodate a roster position for Duclair. He made his NHL debut on October 9, 2014, playing on a line with J. T. Miller and Lee Stempniak for a 3–2 Rangers victory over the St. Louis Blues. He recorded five points in his first seven NHL games, culminating in his first goal on October 27. The Rangers began the third period of that game down 3–0 to the Minnesota Wild, but Duclair scored the game-tying goal against Darcy Kuemper with just under four minutes left to play; 37 seconds later, Mats Zuccarello put the Rangers ahead 5–4 to win.

Duclair struggled to maintain his scoring output after his first goal: after recording one goal and five assists in his first nine games, he added only one more assist through the next nine. Although Vigneault and the Rangers were initially hesitant to send Duclair back to the Remparts, as he would have to remain there until the conclusion of their 2014–15 season, he was too young to play in the American Hockey League (AHL) and was returned to his junior team on January 5, 2015. After being returned to the Remparts, Duclair recorded 34 points in 26 QMJHL games, including seven points in his last four games before the 2015 playoffs. He added another 26 points in 22 playoff games before the Remparts were defeated by the Rimouski Océanic in Game 7 of the President's Cup series.

Arizona Coyotes
On March 1, 2015, while playing with the Remparts, Duclair was traded to the Arizona Coyotes (along with John Moore and two draft picks) in exchange for Keith Yandle and Chris Summers.

Arizona Coyotes general manager Don Maloney confirmed fan speculation by stating that he acquired Duclair from the New York Rangers in the hopes that he would develop line chemistry with a rookie Arizona already possessed, Max Domi. This was due to the fact that during the 2015 World Junior Ice Hockey Championship, Duclair and Domi both showed visible chemistry and were key components in leading Canada to gold.

On October 14, 2015, Duclair scored his first career NHL hat-trick in a 4–0 shut-out win against the Anaheim Ducks. Fellow rookie Max Domi pitched in a goal of his own and an assist on one of Duclair's goals. In Duclair's first full season in the NHL, he developed instant line chemistry with Domi, earning the duo the nickname "The Killer D's".

On January 19, 2017, Duclair was demoted to the team's American Hockey League (AHL) affiliate, the Tucson Roadrunners, due to a lack of production. On March 3, 2017, he returned to the Coyotes.

On January 4, 2018, it was reported that Duclair had requested to be traded from the Coyotes.

Chicago Blackhawks
On January 10, 2018, Duclair was traded (alongside defenceman Adam Clendening) to the Chicago Blackhawks in exchange for forwards Richard Pánik and Laurent Dauphin. His inconsistency carried over to the Blackhawks, after making an initial impact he finished the season scoreless in his last 14 games and finished the season appearing in 23 games for 8 points for Chicago.

On June 25, 2018, as a restricted free agent, Duclair was not tendered a qualifying offer by the Blackhawks and was released to explore free agency.

Columbus Blue Jackets
On July 5, 2018, Duclair signed a one-year, one-way contract worth $650,000 with the Columbus Blue Jackets. In 53 games for the team, Duclair recorded 11 goals and 19 points.

Ottawa Senators
On February 23, 2019, Duclair was traded to the Ottawa Senators (along with second-round picks in 2020 and 2021) in exchange for Ryan Dzingel and a seventh-round pick in 2019. Only a few days before the trade, Blue Jackets head coach John Tortorella publicly criticized Duclair, saying that Duclair "doesn't know how to play". 

On June 17, 2019, Duclair signed a one-year contract with the Senators for the 2019–20 season worth $1.65 million. He immediately became one of Ottawa's top offensive players, recording 21 goals and 30 points in his first 38 games, leading the team in both categories. He was subsequently named as the Senators' representative for the 2020 NHL All-Star Game held on January 25, 2020, in St. Louis.

On June 8, 2020, Duclair became an inaugural executive board member the Hockey Diversity Alliance, whose goal is to address intolerance and racism in hockey. 

In October 2020, Duclair fired his agent and took over contract negotiations with the Senators by himself, against the advice of GM Pierre Dorion. The two sides could not come to an agreement and the Senators declined to offer him a qualifying offer on a new contract, making him a free agent.

Florida Panthers
On December 17, 2020, Duclair signed as a free agent to a one-year, $1.7 million contract with the Florida Panthers.

On July 15, 2021, Duclair signed a three-year, $9 million contract extension with the Panthers.

Career statistics

Regular season and playoffs

International

Awards and honours

References

External links
 

1995 births
Living people
Arizona Coyotes players
Black Canadian ice hockey players
Canadian expatriate ice hockey players in the United States
Canadian ice hockey left wingers
Canadian sportspeople of Haitian descent
Chicago Blackhawks players
Columbus Blue Jackets players
Florida Panthers players
Haitian Quebecers
Ice hockey people from Quebec
New York Rangers draft picks
New York Rangers players
Ottawa Senators players
People from Pointe-Claire
Quebec Remparts players
Sportspeople from Laval, Quebec
Tucson Roadrunners players